Ministry of Development or Ministry of Regional Development may refer to:

Economic development 
 Ministry of Development (Greece), abolished in 2009
 Ministry of Development, Industry and Foreign Trade (Brazil)
 Ministry of Development, Competitiveness and Shipping (Greece), merger of the National Economy Ministry, Ministry of Development, and Mercantile Marine Ministry
 Ministry of Development (Poland)
 Ministry of Development (Turkey)
 Ministry of Economic Development and Trade (Ukraine)

Regional, social or infrastructure development 
 Ministry of Regional Development (Brazil)
 Ministry of Regional Development (Czech Republic)
 Ministry of Regional Development and Infrastructure (Georgia)
Ministry of Regional Development (Kazakhstan)
 Ministry of Construction and Regional Development (Moldova)
 Ministry of Local Government and Regional Development (Norway)
 Ministry of Regional Development (Poland)
 Ministry of Regional Development and Tourism (Romania)
 Ministry of Regional Development (Russia)
 Ministry of Development (Spain)
 Ministry of Regional Development (Tunisia)
 Ministry of Regional Development (Ukraine)